The Swedish National Pensioners' Organisation (PRO) is an advocacy group in Sweden representing pensioners. It's the largest pensioners' organisation in Sweden with 399,303 members as of 31 December 2006.

PRO describes itself as "politically independent" but has since its founding had close ties to the Swedish Social Democratic labour movement. The current chairman is Lars Wettergren, a former Social Democratic politician.

PRO was founded on 1 March 1942.

PRO deliberates with the Swedish government in the government's pensioners' committee and in meetings with the Prime Minister, calls on parliament's committee, participates in state investigations, acts as a referral body and participates in the local authorities', county councils' and regions' pensioners' boards.

Presidents
1942: Karl Pettersson
1951: Olof Linders
1961: Axel Svensson
1975: Artur Kajbjer
1977: Arne Geijer
1979: Lars Sandberg
1996: Lage Andréasson
2004: Lars Wettergren
2008: Curt Persson
2015: Christina Tallberg
2022: Åsa Lindestam

External links 
 Pensionärernas riksorganisation, official website

1942 establishments in Sweden
Political organizations based in Sweden
Swedish Social Democratic Party
Organizations established in 1942